Noemí Simonetto (February 1, 1926 – February 20, 2011) was an Argentine athlete who competed mainly in the long jump.

Early life and career 
Born in Avellaneda, Argentina, she competed for Argentina at the 1948 Summer Olympics held in London, England in the long jump. She won the silver medal in the said tournament. 

She won 17 medals (11 gold) at the South American Championships in Athletics in the years 1941, 1943, 1945 and 1947.

Death 
She died in Buenos Aires, Argentina in February 2011.

References 

1926 births
2011 deaths
Argentine people of Italian descent
Athletes from Buenos Aires
Argentine female sprinters
Argentine female long jumpers
Olympic silver medalists for Argentina
Athletes (track and field) at the 1948 Summer Olympics
Olympic athletes of Argentina
Medalists at the 1948 Summer Olympics
Burials at La Chacarita Cemetery
Olympic silver medalists in athletics (track and field)